Guernsey Power Station is a planned gas-fired power plant under construction in Guernsey County, Ohio south of Byesville. When completed in 2022, it is planned to generate 1.875 GW of power, enough to power 1.5 million homes. When completed it will be the 69th largest power station in the United States.

History 
Regulatory filings were originally submitted in 2016 to take advantage of decreasing natural gas costs, but construction was delayed until 3rd quarter 2019. The power plant sits atop a former coal mine, and was selected in part due to its proximity to the Rockies Express East natural gas pipeline running from Ohio to Missouri.

Construction is expected to create up to 1,000 jobs. Taxes paid during construction will also pay for new buildings at Meadowbrook High School.  In June 2020, local union construction workers protested the use of out-of-state non-union workers on the project instead of the completely local workforce promised. A company spokesperson denied the allegations.

After construction is complete, the plant is expected to provide about 30 full-time jobs, according to a local newspaper's interview with a Caithness Energy official.

While the first unit was scheduled to go online in September 2022, initial start up activity was still underway as of December 2022.

Operation 
GPS will receive its natural gas from the Utica and Marcellus shale formations in eastern Ohio.

Power will be generated by three advanced combined-cycle GE 7HA.02 gas turbines. Water for operation will be provided by Byesville which will then process the wastewater.

References 

Buildings and structures in Guernsey County, Ohio
Natural gas-fired power stations in Ohio
Guernsey County, Ohio
2019 establishments in Ohio